The Antoinette Perry Award for Excellence in Broadway Theatre, more commonly known as the Tony Award, recognizes excellence in live Broadway theatre. The awards are presented by the American Theatre Wing and The Broadway League at an annual ceremony in Midtown Manhattan.

The awards are given for Broadway productions and performances. One is also given for regional theatre. Several discretionary non-competitive awards are given as well, including a Special Tony Award, the Tony Honors for Excellence in Theatre, and the Isabelle Stevenson Award.
 
The awards were founded by theatre producer and director Brock Pemberton and are named after Antoinette "Tony" Perry, an actress, producer and theatre director who was co-founder and secretary of the American Theatre Wing. The trophy consists of a spinnable medallion, with faces portraying an adaptation of the comedy and tragedy masks, mounted on a black base with a pewter swivel.

The rules for the Tony Awards are set forth in the official document "Rules and Regulations of The American Theatre Wing's Tony Awards", which applies for that season only. The Tony Awards are the New York theatre industry's equivalent to the Emmy Awards for television, the Grammy Awards for music, and the Academy Awards (Oscars) for film, and a person who has won all four is said to have won the EGOT. The Tony Awards are the U.S. equivalent of the United Kingdom's Laurence Olivier Awards and France's Molière Awards.

The 75th annual ceremony was held on June 12, 2022, at Radio City Music Hall in New York City and was broadcast live on CBS, as well as the Paramount+ streaming service. Ariana DeBose served as the host.

Award categories

, there were 26 categories of awards, in addition to several special awards. Starting with 11 awards in 1947, the names and number of categories have changed over the years. Some examples: the category Best Book of a Musical was originally called "Best Author (Musical)." The category of Best Costume Design was one of the original awards. For two years, in 1960 and 1961, this category was split into Best Costume Designer (Dramatic) and Best Costume Designer (Musical). It then went to a single category, but in 2005 it was divided again. For the category of Best Director of a Play, a single category was for directors of plays and musicals prior to 1960.

A newly established non-competitive award, The Isabelle Stevenson Award, was given for the first time at the awards ceremony in 2009. The award is for an individual who has made a "substantial contribution of volunteered time and effort on behalf of one or more humanitarian, social service or charitable organizations."

The category of Best Special Theatrical Event was retired as of the 2009–2010 season. The categories of Best Sound Design of a Play and Best Sound Design of a Musical were retired as of the 2014–2015 season. On April 24, 2017, the Tony Awards administration committee announced that the Sound Design Award would be reintroduced for the 2017–2018 season.

Performance categories

 Best Performance by a Leading Actor in a Play
 Best Performance by a Featured Actor in a Play
 Best Performance by a Leading Actor in a Musical
 Best Performance by a Featured Actor in a Musical
 Best Performance by a Leading Actress in a Play
 Best Performance by a Featured Actress in a Play
 Best Performance by a Leading Actress in a Musical
 Best Performance by a Featured Actress in a Musical

Show and technical categories

 Best Musical
 Best Revival of a Musical
 Best Direction of a Musical
 Best Book of a Musical
 Best Original Score
 Best Orchestrations
 Best Choreography
 Best Scenic Design in a Musical
 Best Costume Design in a Musical
 Best Lighting Design in a Musical
 Best Sound Design of a Musical
 Best Play
 Best Revival of a Play
 Best Direction of a Play
 Best Scenic Design in a Play
 Best Costume Design in a Play
 Best Lighting Design in a Play
 Best Sound Design of a Play

Special awards

 Regional Theatre Tony Award
 Special Tony Award (includes Lifetime Achievement Award)
 Tony Honors for Excellence in Theatre
 Isabelle Stevenson Award

Retired awards

 Best Author
 Best Conductor and Musical Director
 Best Costume Design (split into two categories: Best Costume Design in a Musical and Best Costume Design in a Play)
 Best Lighting Design (split into two categories: Best Lighting Design in a Musical and Best Lighting Design in a Play)
 Best Newcomer
 Best Revival (split into two categories: Best Revival of a Musical and Best Revival of a Play)
 Best Scenic Design (split into two categories: Best Scenic Design in a Musical and Best Scenic Design in a Play)
 Best Stage Technician
 Best Special Theatrical Event
 Best Director (split into two categories: Best Direction of a Musical and Best Direction of a Play)

History

The award was founded in 1947 by a committee of the American Theatre Wing (ATW) headed by Brock Pemberton. The award is named after Antoinette Perry, nicknamed Tony, an actress, director, producer and co-founder of the American Theatre Wing, who died in 1946. As her official biography at the Tony Awards website states, "At [Warner Bros. story editor] Jacob Wilk's suggestion, [Pemberton] proposed an award in her honor for distinguished stage acting and technical achievement. At the initial event in 1947, as he handed out an award, he called it a Tony. The name stuck." Nevertheless, the awards were sometimes referred to as the "Perry Awards" in their early years.

The 1st Tony Awards was held on April 6, 1947, at the Waldorf Astoria hotel in New York City. The first prizes were "a scroll, cigarette lighter and articles of jewelry such as 14-carat gold compacts and bracelets for the women, and money clips for the men". ATW co-founder Louise Heims Beck was responsible for over seeing the organization of the first awards. It was not until the third awards ceremony in 1949 that the first Tony medallion was given to award winners.

Since 1967, the award ceremony has been broadcast on U.S. national television and includes songs from the nominated musicals, and occasionally has included video clips of, or presentations about, nominated plays. The American Theatre Wing and The Broadway League jointly present and administer the awards. Audience size for the telecast is generally well below that of the Academy Awards shows, but the program reaches an affluent audience, which is prized by advertisers. According to a June 2003 article in The New York Times: "What the Tony broadcast does have, say CBS officials, is an all-important demographic: rich and smart. Jack Sussman, CBS's senior vice president in charge of specials, said the Tony show sold almost all its advertising slots shortly after CBS announced it would present the three hours. 'It draws upscale premium viewers who are attractive to upscale premium advertisers,' Mr. Sussman said..." The viewership has declined from the early years of its broadcast history (for example, the number of viewers in 1974 was 20 million; in 1999, 9.2 million) but has settled into between six and eight million viewers for most of the decade of the 2000s. In contrast, the 2009 Oscar telecast had 36.3 million viewers.

Medallion 
The Tony Award medallion was designed by art director Herman Rosse and is a mix of mostly brass and a little bronze, with a nickel plating on the outside; a black acrylic glass base, and the nickel-plated pewter swivel. The face of the medallion portrays an adaptation of the comedy and tragedy masks.  Originally, the reverse side had a relief profile of Antoinette Perry; this later was changed to contain the winner's name, award category, production and year. The medallion has been mounted on a black base since 1967.

A larger base was introduced and first presented in the 2010 award ceremony. This change was implemented to make the award "feel more substantial" and easier to handle at the moment the award is presented to the winners, according to Howard Sherman, the executive director of the American Theatre Wing:

For the specific Tony Awards presented to a Broadway production, awards are given to the author and up to two of the producers free of charge. All other members of the above-the-title producing team are eligible to purchase the physical award. Sums collected are designed to help defray the cost of the Tony Awards ceremony itself. An award cost $400 as of at least 2000, $750 as of at least 2009, and, as of 2013, had been $2,500 "for several years", according to Tony Award Productions.

Details of the Tony Awards
Source: Tony Awards Official Site, Rules

Rules for a new play or musical
For the purposes of the award, a new play or musical is one that has not previously been produced on Broadway and is not "determined… to be a 'classic' or in the historical or popular repertoire", as determined by the Administration Committee (per Section (2g) of the Rules and Regulations). The rule about "classic" productions was instituted by the Tony Award Administration Committee in 2002, and stated (in summary) "A play or musical that is determined ... to be a 'classic' or in the historical or popular repertoire shall not be eligible for an award in the Best Play or Best Musical Category but may be eligible in that appropriate Best Revival category." Shows transferred from Off-Broadway or the West End are eligible as "new", as are productions based closely on films.

This rule has been the subject of some controversy, as some shows, such as Hedwig and the Angry Inch and Violet, have been ruled ineligible for the "new" category, meaning that their authors did not have a chance to win the important awards of Best Play or Best Musical (or Best Score or Best Book for musicals). On the other hand, some people feel that allowing plays and musicals that have been frequently produced to be eligible as "new" gives them an unfair advantage because they will have benefited from additional development time as well as additional familiarity with the Tony voters.

Committees and voters
The Tony Awards Administration Committee has twenty-four members: ten designated by the American Theatre Wing, ten by The Broadway League, and one each by the Dramatists Guild, Actors' Equity Association, United Scenic Artists and the Society of Stage Directors and Choreographers. This committee, among other duties, determines eligibility for nominations in all awards categories.

The Tony Awards Nominating Committee makes the nominations for the various categories. This rotating group of theatre professionals is selected by the Tony Awards Administration Committee. Nominators serve three-year terms and are asked to see every new Broadway production. The Nominating Committee for the 2012–13 Broadway season (named in June 2012) had 42 members; the Nominating Committee for the 2014–2015 season has 50 members and was appointed in June 2014.

There are approximately 868 eligible Tony Award voters (as of 2014), a number that changes slightly from year to year. The number was decreased in 2009 when the first-night critics were excluded as voters. That decision was changed, and members of the New York Drama Critics' Circle were invited to be Tony voters beginning in the 2010–2011 season.

The eligible Tony voters include the board of directors and designated members of the advisory committee of the American Theatre Wing, members of the governing boards of Actors' Equity Association, the Dramatists Guild, the Society of Stage Directors and Choreographers, United Scenic Artists, and the Association of Theatrical Press Agents and Managers, members of the Theatrical Council of the Casting Society of America and voting members of The Broadway League (in 2000, what was then The League of American Theaters and Producers changed membership eligibility and Tony voting status from a lifetime honor to all above-the-title producers, to ones who had been active in the previous 10 years. This action disenfranchised scores of Tony voters, including Gail Berman, Harve Brosten, Dick Button, Tony Lo Bianco, and Raymond Serra).

Eligibility date (Season)
To be eligible for Tony Award consideration, a production must have officially opened on Broadway by the eligibility date that the Management Committee establishes each year. For example, the cut-off date for eligibility the 2013–2014 season was April 24, 2014. The season for Tony Award eligibility is defined in the Rules and Regulations.

In 2020, the 74th Annual Tony Awards were postponed due to the COVID-19 pandemic. On August 21, 2020, it was announced that the 74th Annual Tony Awards would take place digitally later in 2020.

Broadway theatre
A Broadway theatre is defined as having 500 or more seats, among other requirements. While the rules define a Broadway theatre in terms of its size, not its geographical location, the list of Broadway theatres is determined solely by the Tony Awards Administration Committee. As of the 2016–2017 season, the list consisted solely of 41 theaters: 40 located in the vicinity of Times Square in New York City and Lincoln Center's Vivian Beaumont Theater.

Criticism 
While the theatre-going public may consider the Tony Awards to be the Oscars of live theatre, critics have suggested that the Tony Awards are primarily a promotional vehicle for a small number of large production companies and theatre owners in New York City. In a 2014 Playbill article, Robert Simonson wrote that "Who gets to perform on the Tony Awards broadcast, what they get to perform, and for how long, have long been politically charged questions in the Broadway theatre community..." The producers "accept the situation ... because just as much as actually winning a Tony, a performance that lands well with the viewing public can translate into big box-office sales." Producer Robyn Goodman noted that, if the presentation at the ceremony shows well and the show wins a Tony, "you’re going to spike at the box office".

The awards met further criticism when they eliminated the sound design awards in 2014. In 2014, a petition calling for the return of the Sound Design categories received more than 30,000 signatures. Addressing their previous concerns over Tony voters in the category, it was announced that upon the awards' return for the 2017–2018 season, they would be decided by a subset of voters based on their expertise.

Some advocates of gender equality and non-binary people have criticized the separation of male and female acting categories in the Tony Awards, Academy Awards, and Emmy Awards. Though some commentators worry that gender discrimination would cause men to dominate unsegregated categories, other categories are unsegregated. The Grammy Awards went gender-neutral in 2012, while the Daytime Emmy Awards introduced a single Outstanding Younger Performer in a Drama Series category in 2019 to replace their two gender-specific younger actor and actress categories.

Award milestones

Some notable records and facts about the Tony Awards include the following:

Productions
 Nominations: The most Tony nominations ever received by a single production was the musical Hamilton (2016) with 16 nominations in 13 categories, narrowly passing the previous holders of this record, The Producers (2001; 15 nominations in 12 categories) and Billy Elliot (2009; 15 nominations in 13 categories). The most Tony nominations for a non-musical play was Slave Play (2020; 12 nominations in 10 categories).
 Wins: The most Tony Awards ever received by a single production was the musical The Producers (2001) with 12 awards, including Best Musical.
 Non-musical wins: The most Tonys ever received by a non-musical play was The Coast of Utopia (2007) with 7 awards, including Best Play.
 Most nominations with fewest wins: Musicals The Scottsboro Boys (2011) and Mean Girls (2018), as well as non-musical play Slave Play (2020) are tied: all three were nominated for 12 Tony Awards but did not win any. 
Four musicals have won all "big six" awards for original musicals: South Pacific (1950 awards), Sweeney Todd: The Demon Barber of Fleet Street (1979 awards), Hairspray (2003 awards) and The Band's Visit (2018 awards); each won the Best Musical, Best Score, Best Book, Best Performance by a Leading Actor, Best Performance by a Leading Actress, and Best Direction awards.
Two Plays have won all "big four" awards for original plays: Who's Afraid of Virginia Woolf? (1963 awards) and The Real Thing (1984 awards); both won the Best Play, Best Performance by a Leading Actor, Best Performance by a Leading Actress, and Best Direction awards.
 Acting Awards: Only one production, South Pacific (1950 awards), has won all four of the acting awards in a single year.
 Words and Music: Only seven musicals have won the Tony Award for Best Musical when a person had (co-)written the Book (non-sung dialogue and storyline) and the Score (music and lyrics): 1958 winner The Music Man (Meredith Willson – award for Book and Score did not exist that year), 1986 winner The Mystery of Edwin Drood (Rupert Holmes – who also won for Book and Score), 1996 winner Rent (Jonathan Larson posthumously – who also won for Book and Score), 2011 winner The Book of Mormon (Trey Parker, Robert Lopez, and Matt Stone also won for Book and Score), 2016 winner Hamilton (Lin-Manuel Miranda also won for Book and Score), 2019 winner Hadestown (Anaïs Mitchell also won for Score), and 2022 winner A Strange Loop (Michael R Jackson also won for Book)
 Design Awards: Eleven shows have swept the Design Awards (original 3 of Best Scenic Design, Best Costume Design, Best Lighting Design – joined by Best Sound Design starting in 2008): Follies (1972), The Phantom of the Opera (1986), The Lion King (1998), The Producers (2001), The Light in the Piazza (2005), The Coast of Utopia (2007),  the 2008 revival of South Pacific (first to sweep the expanded four awards for Creative Arts), Peter and the Starcatcher (first straight play to sweep the expanded four awards for Creative Arts) (2012), Harry Potter and the Cursed Child (2018), A Christmas Carol and Moulin Rouge! (both 2020).
 Revivals: Death of a Salesman by Arthur Miller in 2012 became the first show (play or musical) to win as Best Production in four different years, Best Play at the 1949 awards, Best Revival at the 1984 awards (before the Best Revival award was split into two categories for Play and Musical in 1994), and Best Revival of a Play at the 1999 and 2012 awards. La Cage aux Folles made history as the first musical to win as Best Production in three different years, Best Musical at the 1984 awards and Best Revival of a Musical at both the 2005 awards and the 2010 awards. The King and I has also garnered three Tony Awards, one for each time it has been produced on Broadway, first as Best Musical and then twice as Best Revival of a Musical. Company has also won three Tony Awards, first as Best Musical in 1971, followed by Best Revival of a Musical in 2007 and 2022.

Individuals
 Wins: Harold Prince has received 21 Tony Awards, more than anyone else, including eight for Best Direction of a Musical, eight for Best Musical, two for Best Producer of a Musical, and three special Tony Awards. Tommy Tune has received ten Tony Awards including three for direction, four for choreography, two for performing, and one special Tony Award. Stephen Sondheim has won more music Tony Awards than any other individual, with eight awards (six for Best Original Score, one for Best Composer, and one for Best Lyricist). Bob Fosse has won the most Tonys for choreography, also eight. Oliver Smith has won a record eight scenic design Tony Awards. Jules Fisher has won the most lighting design awards, with nine. Audra McDonald has the most performance Tony Awards with six. Terrence McNally and Tom Stoppard are the most awarded writers with four Tonys each; McNally has won Best Play twice and Best Book of a Musical twice, while Stoppard has won Best Play four times.
 Most nominations: Julie Harris and Chita Rivera have been nominated more often than any other performer, ten apiece.
 Performers in two categories: Six performers have been nominated in two acting categories in the same year: Amanda Plummer, Dana Ivey, Kate Burton, Jan Maxwell, Mark Rylance, and Jeremy Pope.  Plummer in 1982 was nominated for Best Actress in a Play for A Taste of Honey and Best Featured Actress in a Play for Agnes of God, for which she won. Ivey in 1984 was nominated as Best Featured Actress in Musical for Sunday in the Park with George and Best Featured Actress in a Play for Heartbreak House. In 2002, Burton was nominated for Best Actress in Play for Hedda Gabler and Best Featured Actress in a Play for The Elephant Man. Maxwell was nominated in 2010 for Best Actress in a Play for The Royal Family and Best Featured Actress in a Play for Lend Me a Tenor. Rylance was nominated in 2014 for Best Actor in a Play for Richard III and Best Featured Actor in a Play for Twelfth Night, for which he won. Pope was nominated in 2019 for Best Actor in a Play for Choir Boy and Best Featured Actor in a Musical for Ain't Too Proud.
 Performers in all categories: Five performers have been nominated for all four performance awards for which a performer is eligible.
 Boyd Gaines was the first performer to be nominated for each of Best Featured Actor in a Play in The Heidi Chronicles (1989), Best Actor in a Musical for She Loves Me (1994), Best Featured Actor in a Musical for Contact (2000) and Gypsy (2008) and Best Actor in a Play for Journey's End (2007). Gaines won in three of the categories (and four of the five nominations), missing only for the performance in Journey's End.
 Raúl Esparza was the second performer to be nominated in all four categories (no wins), achieving this over a mere six seasons: Best Featured Actor in a Musical for Taboo (2004), Best Actor in a Musical for Company (2007), Best Featured Actor in a Play for The Homecoming (2008), and Best Actor in a Play for Speed-the-Plow (2009).
 Angela Lansbury was the third performer to be nominated for all four performance awards. She won Best Actress in a Musical for Mame (1966), Dear World (1969), Gypsy (1975), and Sweeney Todd (1979). She was nominated for Best Actress in a Play for Deuce (2007). She won Best Featured Actress in a Play for Blithe Spirit (2009). She was nominated for Featured Actress in a Musical for A Little Night Music (2010).
 Jan Maxwell became the fourth performer to achieve this distinction by being nominated (no wins) for Best Featured Actress in a Musical for Chitty Chitty Bang Bang (2005), Best Featured Actress in a Play for Coram Boy (2007) and Lend Me a Tenor (2010), Best Actress in a Play for The Royal Family (2010), and Best Actress in a Musical for Follies (2012). 
 Audra McDonald became the fifth performer to accomplish the feat and the first to win in all four categories, winning Best Performance by a Featured Actress in a Musical for Carousel (1994) and Ragtime (1998), Best Performance by a Featured Actress in a Play for Master Class (1996) and A Raisin in the Sun (2004), Best Performance by a Leading Actress in a Musical for Porgy and Bess (2012), and Best Performance by a Leading Actress in a Play for Lady Day at Emerson's Bar and Grill (2014). She was nominated for Best Performance by a Leading Actress in a Musical for Marie Christine (2000) and 110 in the Shade (2007) and for Best Performance by a Leading Actress in a Play for Frankie and Johnny in the Clair de Lune (2020/21).
 Performers Playing Opposite Sex: While several performers have won Tonys for roles that have involved cross-dressing, only four have won for playing a character of the opposite sex: Mary Martin in the title role of Peter Pan (1955), Harvey Fierstein as Edna Turnblad in Hairspray (2003), Mark Rylance as Olivia in Twelfth Night (2014), and Lena Hall as Yitzhak in Hedwig and the Angry Inch (2014). In 2000, Australian actor Barry Humphries won the Special Tony Award for a live theatrical event at the 55th Annual Tony Awards for Dame Edna: The Royal Tour.
 Shared Performances: All three of the young actors who shared the duties of performing the lead character in Billy Elliot the Musical (2009 awards) David Alvarez, Trent Kowalik and Kiril Kulish also shared a single nomination, then shared the win, for Best Actor in a Musical. Previously, the only prior joint winners were John Kani and Winston Ntshona, who shared the Best Actor in a Play award in 1975 for Sizwe Banzi is Dead and The Island, two plays they co-wrote and co-starred in.
 Two genders for one role: Ben Vereen and Patina Miller both won, respectively, Best Actor in a Musical in 1972 and Best Actress in a Musical in 2013 for the role of the Leading Player in Pippin, marking the first time the same role has been won by both a man and a woman in a Broadway production.
 Writing and performing: Two people have won Tonys as an author and as a performer. Harvey Fierstein won Best Play and Best Lead Actor in a Play for Torch Song Trilogy (1983), Best Book of a Musical for La Cage aux Folles, and Best Lead Actor in a Musical for Hairspray. Tracy Letts, the author of 2008 Best Play August: Osage County, won Best Lead Actor in a Play for Who's Afraid of Virginia Woolf? (2013).
 Youngest and oldest winners of Best Score or Best Book: Lin-Manuel Miranda is the youngest person to win the award; he was 28 when he won for In The Heights. If T. S. Eliot had been alive when he won for Cats, he would have been 94. Eliot is one of two people to receive the award posthumously, the other being Jonathan Larson, who won for Rent. He would have been 36.
Youngest and oldest actors to win: Frank Langella is the oldest actor to win a Tony, for his performance in The Father (won at age 78), and Lois Smith holds the record for oldest actress for her performance in The Inheritance (won at age 90). The youngest actor to win a Tony Award, at age 11, was Frankie Michaels, in 1966, for his featured performance in Mame, a record which still stands today. Twenty-five years later, at 11 and a half years old, Daisy Eagan took home a Tony Award for Best Featured Actress in a Musical for her performance in The Secret Garden, cementing her place in Tony history as the youngest woman to win the award. 
Youngest and oldest winners for Best Performance by a Leading Actress in a Musical: Liza Minelli is the youngest actress to win the award, for her performance in Flora the Red Menace (won at age 19). Bette Midler is the oldest actress to win the award, for her performance in Hello, Dolly! (won at age 71). 

In 2013, the four girls who alternated for the title role in Matilda the Musical (Sophia Gennusa, aged 9; Bailey Ryon, aged 10; Oona Laurence, aged 10; and Milly Shapiro, aged 10) won a joint Tony Honors award, making Gennusa the youngest to ever receive a Tony, albeit a non-competitive one.

Firsts
 First African-American to win Best Performance by a Featured Actress in a Musical: Juanita Hall for South Pacific in 1950.
 First African-American to win Best Performance by a Featured Actor in a Musical: Harry Belafonte for John Murray Anderson's Almanac in 1954.
 First female author to win Best Play: Frances Goodrich with her partner (and husband) Albert Hackett for The Diary of Anne Frank in 1956.
 First African-American to win Best Performance by a Leading Actress in a Musical: Diahann Carroll for No Strings in 1962.
 First African-American to win Best Performance by a Leading Actor in a Play: James Earl Jones for The Great White Hope in 1969.
 First African-American to win Best Performance by a Leading Actor in a Musical: Cleavon Little for Purlie in 1970.
 First African-American author to win Best Play: Joseph A. Walker for The River Niger in 1974.
 First African-American composer to solely win Tony Award for Best Score: Charlie Smalls for The Wiz in 1975.
 First female to win Tony Award for Best Score: Betty Comden for On the Twentieth Century in 1978. (In 1968, she became the first female to win the previous version of the Best Score Award, the Tony Award for Best Composer And Lyricist for Hallelujah, Baby!)
 First Asian-American author to win Best Play: David Henry Hwang for M Butterfly in 1988.
 First Asian-American to win Best Performance by a Featured Actor in a Play: BD Wong for M Butterfly in 1988.
 First female author to solely win Best Play: Wendy Wasserstein for The Heidi Chronicles in 1989.
 First Asian to win Best Performance by a Leading Actress in a Musical: Lea Salonga for Miss Saigon in 1991.
 First female to win Best Direction of a Musical: Julie Taymor for The Lion King in 1998.
 First female to win Best Direction of a Play: Garry Hynes for The Beauty Queen of Leenane in 1998.
 First African-American to win Best Performance by a Leading Actress in a Play: Phylicia Rashad for A Raisin in the Sun in 2004.
First Brazilian to win Best Performance by a Leading Actor in a Musical: Paulo Szot for South Pacific  in 2008.
 First female to solely win Tony Award for Best Score: Cyndi Lauper for Kinky Boots in 2013.
 First Asian-American to win Best Performance by a Featured Actress in a Musical: Ruthie Ann Miles for The King and I in 2015.
 First female team to win Tony Award for Best Score and Tony Award for Best Book: Jeanine Tesori & Lisa Kron for Fun Home in 2015.
First Latiné playwright to win Tony Award for Best Play: Matthew López for The Inheritance in 2020.   
 First Lebanese-American to win Tony Award for Best Performance by a Leading Actor in a Musical: Tony Shalhoub for The Band's Visit in 2018.
 First Yemeni-American to win Tony Award for Best Performance by a Featured Actor in a Musical: Ari'el Stachel for The Band's Visit in 2018.
 First person who uses a wheelchair to be nominated for and to receive a Tony Award for acting: Ali Stroker with the Tony Award for Best Featured Actress in a Musical for Oklahoma! in 2019.
 First female to be nominated for and to win Best Sound Design of a Musical: Jessica Paz for  Hadestown in 2019.
 First openly trans performer to be nominated for a Tony Award: L Morgan Lee with the Tony Award for Best Featured Actress in a Musical for A Strange Loop in 2022.

See also

 African-American Tony nominees and winners
 Drama Desk Award
 Helpmann Awards
 Laurence Olivier Awards
 LGBT culture in New York City
 List of Tony Awards ceremonies
 Obie Award
 Society of London Theatre
 Theatre World Award

References

External links
  Tony Award ® Productions
 
 
 
 
 Tony Awards (CBS official broadcast website)
 American Theatre Wing (official website)
 The Broadway League (official website)

 
American theater awards
Performing arts trophies
Annual events in New York City
American annual television specials
Broadway theatre
CBS television specials
Competitions in New York City
Radio City Music Hall
Awards established in 1947
1947 establishments in New York City
1947 in New York City